The following lists events that happened during 2000 in South Korea.

Incumbents
 President: Kim Dae-jung
 Prime Minister: 
 until 13 January: Kim Jong-pil 
 13 January-19 May: Park Tae-joon
 starting 22 May: Lee Han-dong

Events 
 January: The Democratic Labor Party is founded.
 February 22: OhmyNews is launched.
 April 13 South Korean legislative election
 June 13–15: The first Inter-Korean summit
 June 15: June 15th North–South Joint Declaration
 July 15–17: The first Busan Rock Festival
 September 12 Typhoon Saomai
 November 24 Mnet Asian Music Awards

Sport
 2000 K League
 2000 Korean FA Cup
 2000 Korean League Cup
 2000 CONCACAF Gold Cup

Films
 List of South Korean films of 2000

Births

 January 6 – Kwon Eun-bin, singer (CLC)
 January 7 – Kang Chan-hee, actor and singer (SF9)
 January 9 - Kim Ji-hoon, actor
 January 10 - Choi Da-bin, figure skater
 January 11 – Lee Chae-yeon, former member of Iz*One
 January 13 – Mia, singer and dancer (EVERGLOW)
 February 12 – Kim Ji-min, actress
 March 20 – Hyunjin, singer and dancer (Stray Kids)
 March 21 - Yoon San-ha, singer
 April 11 – Yu Jimin (stage name Karina), leader of aespa
 April 23 – Jeno, singer (NCT)
 May 10 – Bae Jin-young, singer (CIX)
 May 18 – Onda, singer and (EVERGLOW)
 May 26 – Yeji, singer and dancer (ITZY)
 June 6 – Haechan, singer (NCT)
 June 23 – Kim Hyun-soo, actress
 July 7 - HAON, rapper
 July 21
 Lia, singer (ITZY)
 Aisha, singer (EVERGLOW)
 July 31 - Kim Sae-ron, actress
 August 1 – Kim Chae-won, leader of Le Sserafim
 August 9 – Kim Hyang-gi, actress
 August 13 – Jaemin, singer (NCT)
 September 14 – Han Jisung, rapper, singer-songwriter and record producer (Stray Kids)
 September 15 - Lee Felix, dancer (Stray Kids) 
 September 22 – Seungmin, singer (Stray Kids)
 October 19 – Heejin, singer and dancer (LOONA)
 October 30 – Uchinaga Aeri (stage name Giselle), Japanese member of Aespa
 November 15 – Kim Hyunjin, singer and dancer (LOONA)
 November 19 – Gowon, singer (LOONA)
 December 5 – Soobin, singer (TXT)
December 22 -  Eric, singer (The Boyz)

Deaths
June 15  – Kim Hwan-sung, singer (NRG)

See also
2000 in South Korean music

References

 
South Korea
Years of the 20th century in South Korea
2000s in South Korea
South Korea